Puerto Rican singer Ricky Martin has recorded material for ten studio albums and sang songs in Spanish, English, Italian and Portuguese; he has also recorded bilingual tracks. He began his career at age of 12, in 1984, as a lead singer of the band Menudo. Five years later he left the band and pursued a solo career, releasing his debut eponymous studio album in 1991. On the Spanish record, he collaborated with various songwriters and composers; "Fuego Contra Fuego", the lead single, was written by Carlos Goméz and Mariano Perez, while on "El Amor de Mi Vida" he worked with Eddie Sierra. On the record, he also sang a Spanish version of Larry Williams' 1957 single "Bony Moronie", titled "Popotitos".

In 1995, Martin teamed up with former band member, Robi Draco Rosa to work on his third studio album, A Medio Vivir, a record influenced by rock music and combined with Latin styles such as flamenco and cumbia. With Rosa's help several songs were penned for the record, including, "Fuego de Noche, Nieve de Día", "Volverás" and "María". The latter became a hit and was remixed as a bilingual English-Spanish version, released in 1998. Martin's fourth studio album, Vuelve, established his commercial music career in the United States. On it, Martin again worked with Rosa and other songwriters including Luis Gómez Escolar and K.C. Porter. "La Copa de la Vida (The Cup of Life)" penned by Escolar and Rosa together with Desmond Child became a worldwide hit and the official song of the 1998 FIFA World Cup.

In 1999, Martin released "Livin' la Vida Loca", a track co-written by Rosa, Child, and Escolar; it became a worldwide success and Martin's best-selling single. It was succeeded by Martin's second eponymous studio album and his first English recording, that same year. Rosa and Child also co-wrote other songs on the album including, "Spanish Eyes" and "I Am Made of You". Madonna co-wrote and was featured on "Be Careful (Cuidado Con Mi Corazón)", a track penned and produced by William Orbit. The next year, the singer released his sixth overall and second English album, Sound Loaded (2000). Once again, Child and Rosa were involved in the writing process having done "She Bangs" and "Saint Tropez". Child, alongside Gary Burr and Victoria Shaw, penned the ballad, "Nobody Wants to Be Lonely", which was later remixed with additional vocals from Christina Aguilera.

Almas del Silencio, Martin's seventh studio album, was released in 2003. For the Spanish record, Antonio Rayo, José Miguel Velásquez and Jodi Marr co-wrote, "Jaleo", which was recorded in both Spanish and Spanglish versions. Following a two-year break, in 2005, Martin released his third English album, Life. On the record, he worked with producer Scott Storch who co-wrote, "I Don't Care", a song that featured rapper Fat Joe and singer Amerie. He collaborated with Diane Warren who co-wrote the ballad, "Stop Time Tonight". Martin's recording sessions with will.i.am resulted in two songs for the album, "It's Alright" and "Drop It on Me".

Martin's ninth studio album, Música + Alma + Sexo, was released in early 2011. A bilingual Spanish-English album, it was predominantly a dance and "lite-pop" record. Martin and Child co-wrote all the songs on the album, which featured recording artists Joss Stone on "The Best Thing About Me Is You" and Claudia Leitte on "Samba", a Portuguese recording. In 2014, he collaborated with Wisin and Jennifer Lopez on the song, "Adrenalina", which was released in two versions, Spanish and Spanglish. He sang "Vida" in Spanish, Portuguese and Spanglish; the latter version was part of the One Love, One Rhythm compilation. His tenth studio album, A Quien Quiera Escuchar was released in 2015; this Latin pop record also featured such artists as Rayo, Yotuel Romero, and Pedro Capó.

Songs

See also 

Ricky Martin albums discography
Ricky Martin singles discography
Menudo discography

Notes

References

External links 
Ricky Martin discography on AllMusic

Ricky Martin
Martin, Ricky